The Book of Lord Shang is an ancient Chinese text from the 3rd century BC, regarded as a foundational work of "Chinese Legalism". The earliest surviving of such texts (the second being the Han Feizi), it is named for and to some extent attributed to major Qin reformer Shang Yang, who served as minister to Duke Xiao of Qin (r. 361338) from 359 until his death in 338 and is generally considered to be the father of that state's "legalism".

The Book of Lord Shang includes a large number of ordinances, essays, and courtly petitions attributed to Shang Yang, as well as discourses delivered at the Qin court. The book focuses mainly on maintaining societal order through a system of impartial laws that strictly mete out rewards and punishments for citizens' actions. The first chapters advise promoting agriculture and suppressing other low-priority secondary activities, as well as encouraging martial virtues for use in creating and maintaining a state army for wars of conquest.

Textual tradition
With some chapters written decades or even more than a century after his death, no critical scholar supposes the text to have been written by Shang Yang, though "some chapters were almost certainly penned by Shang Yang himself; others may come from the hand of his immediate disciples and followers." Highly composite, it nonetheless forms a "relatively coherent ideological vision", likely reflecting the evolution of what Zheng Liangshu (1989) dubbed Shang Yang's 'intellectual current' (xuepai 學派).

Like the later Han Feizi, the Book of Lord Shang insists on the anachronism of the policies of the distant past, drawing on more recent history. In comparison with the Han Feizi, though considering them to be "digressions of minor importance", Yuri Pines notes in Legalism in Chinese Philosophy that the Book of Lord Shang "allowed for the possibility that the need for excessive reliance on coercion would end and a milder, morality-driven political structure would evolve." The Han Feizi does not.

Michael Puett and Mark Edward Lewis compare the Rites of Zhou to the "Legalism" of Shang Yang.

Overview
The Book of Lord Shang teaches that "The law is an expression of love for the people... The sage, if he is able to strengthen the state thereby, does not model himself on antiquity, and if he is able to benefit the people thereby, does not adhere to the established rites." As such, the philosophy espoused is quite explicitly anti-Confucian:

Translations
 Duyvendak, J. J. L. (1928).  The Book of Lord Shang.  London: Arthur Probsthain; reprinted (1963), Chicago: University of Chicago Press.
  Shimizu, Kiyoshi 清水潔 (1970).  Shōshi 商子 [Shangzi]. Tokyo: Meitoku shuppansha.
  Levi, Jean (1981). Le Livre du prince Shang [The Book of Prince Shang].  Paris: Flammarion.
 Pines, Yuri (2017).  The Book of Lord Shang - Apologetics of State Power in Early China (Translations from the Asian Classics).  New York: Columbia University Press.
  Vogelsang, Kai (2017) Shangjun shu – Schriften des Fürsten von Shang. Stuttgart, Alfred Kröner Verlag, ISBN 978-3-520-16801-6

References
Footnotes

Works cited

External links

Text of the work
 The Book of Lord Shang Chinese-English parallel text, Chinese Text Project
 Text of The Book of Lord Shang -(translated by J.J.-L. Duyvendak (1889-1954) into English in 1928)
 Shangzi by Lord Shang -(Chinese; from Project Gutenberg)

Legalist texts
Chinese law
Qin (state)